Denhams Beach is a suburb of Batemans Bay in Eurobodalla Shire, New South Wales, Australia.

References

Towns in New South Wales
Towns in the South Coast (New South Wales)
Eurobodalla Shire
Coastal towns in New South Wales